Naas C.B.S. is a Christian Brothers secondary school in Naas, County Kildare, Ireland.

History
Méanscoil Iognáid Rís is a voluntary secondary school under the trusteeship of the  Edmund Rice Schools Trust (E.R.S.T). The school, named after the founder of the order Edmund Rice, opened its doors in September 1871. The Moat Hall as it is now known was both monastery and school for the Brothers until 1903, when the monastery on Friary Road was built. For over seventy years both the primary and secondary schools were housed in the hall. In 1954 St. Corban's B.N.S was built and four years later the secondary school moved to its present site on St. Corban's Lane.

Extracurricular activities
In February 2022, the school's Gaelic football team won a Leinster Final in St. Conleths Park against Maynooth.

Naas CBS also has a rugby team, badminton team, hurling team, cross country team, basketball team, soccer team and a tennis team.

Along with the school's sports teams, there is a Green Schools Committee, a Yearbook Committee, a beekeeper club and a student council.

On March 17, 2022 Naas CBS were the winners of the Hogan cup. This win is credited mainly to the school's supporters, the “Barmy Army”, who are the most well known Gaelic Football "ultras" in Ireland.

Notable staff
Pádraig Nolan was teaching at the school when he was appointed manager of the Kildare county football team in 2002.

Notable past pupils
Niall Madden, Irish Jockey who won the 2006 Grand National steeplechase on Numbersixvalverde
Charlie McCreevy, former Minister for Finance and European Commissioner for Internal Market and Services
Adam Byrne, Connacht, Leinster and Ireland rugby player.
Sean and Conor Price, former X Factor contestants (2017)

References

External links
 http://www.naascbs.ie

Schools in Ireland